There have been two uses of Columbus and Greenville Railway, both for the same rail line.

Original Columbus and Greenville
The first Columbus and Greenville Railway  was formed by the sale of the Southern Railway operated Southern Railway in Mississippi, to local interests. In January 1952, the CAGY retired its last steam locomotive, Baldwin 4-6-0 Ten-Wheeler #304 built in 1904. It continued independent operations until 1972 when it was bought by the Illinois Central Gulf Railroad.

Present Columbus and Greenville
The second Columbus and Greenville Railway  was founded in 1974 and began operations in 1975 over divested Illinois Central Gulf Railroad trackage across the state of Mississippi.  Its terminals, as the name implies, are Columbus and Greenville, Mississippi.

This action split the line in two. The western section operates between Greenville and Greenwood with an interchange with Canadian National in Greenwood. The eastern section operates the remaining trackage from West Point onwards.

The company once specialized in transporting wood and paper products to and from local factories. The company's traffic base has expanded to include bricks, plastic products, feed grains for catfish and swine, finished and raw steel, and biodiesel as well as cotton and rice products. The company runs six trains a day, two between Greenwood and Greenville, two out of Columbus and two at the Severcorr steel mill between Columbus and Artesia.

The majority owner of the Columbus and Greenville is CAGY Industries, which also owns the Luxapalila Valley Railroad and the Chattooga and Chickamauga Railway.

In June 2008, CAGY Industries was purchased by Genesee & Wyoming Inc.

Preservation
Several pieces of CAGY equipment have been preserved and put on display:
Baldwin locomotive #601 is on display in front of the Columbus & Greenville shops in Columbus, MS.
Baldwin locomotive #606 "City of Moorhead" is on display at the Illinois Railway Museum.
Caboose #500 is on display in Winona, MS next to the train depot downtown.
Caboose #503 is on display in Propst Park in Columbus, MS along with some C&G passenger coaches and a GM&O steam locomotive.
Caboose #506 is in downtown Kosciusko, MS.
Caboose #508 is in front of a doctor's office in Greenwood, MS.

See also 

 Waverly Bridge (Mississippi)

References

External links
Columbus and Greenville Railway official webpage - Genesee and Wyoming website
CAGY Industries 
Columbus and Greenville Railway 

HawkinsRails.net CAGY collection

Columbus, Mississippi
Former Class I railroads in the United States
Genesee & Wyoming
Greenville, Mississippi
Mississippi railroads
Predecessors of the Illinois Central Railroad
Railway companies established in 1923
Railway companies disestablished in 1972
Railway companies established in 1974
Spin-offs of the Illinois Central Gulf Railroad
American companies established in 1923